The 1989 Los Angeles Open was a men's tennis tournament played on outdoor hard courts at the Los Angeles Tennis Center in Los Angeles, California, United States as part of the 1989 Nabisco Grand Prix. It was the 63rd edition of the tournament and was held from September 18 through September 24, 1989. Fifth-seeded Aaron Krickstein won the singles title.

Finals

Singles

 Aaron Krickstein defeated  Michael Chang 2–6, 6–4, 6–2
 It was Krickstein's 2nd title of the year and the 6th of his career.

Doubles

 Martin Davis /  Tim Pawsat defeated  John Fitzgerald /  Anders Järryd 7–5, 7–6
 It was Davis' only title of the year and the 8th of his career. It was Pawsat's 2nd title of the year and the 4th of his career.

References

External links
 ITF tournament edition details

Los Angeles Open
Los Angeles Open (tennis)
Los Angeles Open
Los Angeles Open
Los Angeles Open